|}

The Hoppings Stakes is a Group 3 flat horse race in Great Britain open to mares and fillies aged three years or older.
It is run at Newcastle over a distance of 1 mile 2 furlongs and 42 yards (2,050 metres), and it is scheduled to take place each year in late June.  It is named after the annual funfair which takes place each June on Newcastle's Town Moor, the original site of Newcastle racecourse before its move to Gosforth Park.

The race was first run in 1999. It was originally contested at Listed level before being upgraded to Group 3 status in 2018.

Records

Leading jockey (3 wins):
Jim Crowley – Smart Call (2018), Sun Maiden (2019), Zeyaadah (2021)

Leading trainer (3 wins):
 Michael Stoute – Fictitious (1999), Smart Call (2018), Sun Maiden (2019)

Winners

See also
 Horse racing in Great Britain
 List of British flat horse races

References

Racing Post:
 ifhaonline.org – International Federation of Horseracing Authorities – Hoppings Stakes (2019).

Flat races in Great Britain
Newcastle Racecourse
Middle distance horse races for fillies and mares
Recurring sporting events established in 1999
1999 establishments in England